Kieran Crowley (1949-2016) was an American journalist and New York Times best-selling writer.

He was a longtime contributor at The New York Post, specializing in crime reporting. While at the Post, he decoded messages that were sent to the police by a serial killer later identified as Heriberto Seda. He earned a lifetime achievement award in 2014 from the Press Club of Long Island.

Crowley also wrote true crime books and novels, notably a series starring F.X. Shepard, a tabloid news reporter.

He died at the age of 66 from leukemia complications.

Bibliography
Non-fiction
 Sleep My Little Dead: The True Story of the Zodiac Killer (1997, St. Martin's); about murderer Heriberto Seda
 Burned Alive (1999, St. Martin's)
 The Surgeon's Wife (2001, St. Martin's); about murderer Robert Bierenbaum; a New York Times best-seller.
 Almost Paradise (2005, St. Martin's); about murderer Ted Ammon

Fiction
 1787 (2008, Five Star), under the pen name Sean Michael Bailey
 Hack: An F.X. Shepard novel (2015, Titan Books)
 Shoot: An F.X. Shepherd novel (2016, Titan Books)

References

American male journalists
American male novelists
Deaths from leukemia
1949 births
2016 deaths
New York Post people
21st-century American novelists
21st-century American non-fiction writers
21st-century American male writers